The River Tat is a short river in the County of Norfolk, England. It is an important headwater for the River Wensum of which it is a tributary. Its source is on Syderstone Common, just north of the village of Tattersett. The marshes and pools of Syderstone Common that provide the headwaters for the river are a site of special scientific interest (SSSI) and are the home of a viable colony of the rare Natterjack Toad.

References

Tat